Brnobići is a village in Buzet municipality in Istria County, Croatia.

References

Populated places in Istria County